RTV Utrecht is a regional television and radio broadcaster in the Utrecht Province of the Netherlands.

References

External links
 http://www.rtvutrecht.nl/

Mass media companies of the Netherlands